Fonfría is a Spanish municipality in the province of Zamora, Castile and León. It has a population of 1,070 and an area of 132.37 km².

This article contains information from the Spanish Wikipedia article Fonfría (Zamora), accessed on January 7, 2008.

Town hall
Fonfría is home to the town hall of 9 villages:
Fonfría (171 inhabitants, INE 2020).
Bermillo de Alba (118 inhabitants, INE 2020).
Fornillos de Aliste (115 inhabitants, INE 2020).
Ceadea (87 inhabitants, INE 2020).
Moveros (85 inhabitants, INE 2020).
Castro de Alcañices (70 inhabitants, INE 2020).
Brandilanes (58 inhabitants, INE 2020).
Arcillera (46 inhabitants, INE 2020).
Salto de Castro (0 inhabitants, INE 2020).

Municipalities of the Province of Zamora